Billy-Scott Irakose (born 30 October 1996) is a Burundian swimmer. He competed in the men's 50 metre freestyle event at the 2016 Summer Olympics, where he ranked 66th with a time of 26.36 seconds. He did not advance to the semifinals. He represented Burundi at the 2019 African Games held in Rabat, Morocco.

References

External links
 

1996 births
Living people
Burundian male freestyle swimmers
Olympic swimmers of Burundi
Swimmers at the 2016 Summer Olympics
Place of birth missing (living people)
African Games competitors for Burundi
Swimmers at the 2019 African Games
21st-century Burundian people